This article contains the results of the Tipperary county hurling team in the Championship during the 2010s.
During this period they won 4 Munster titles in 2011, 2012, 2015, and 2016 and won 3 All Ireland titles in 2010, 2016, and 2019.

2010

2011

2012

2013

2014

2015

2016

2017

2018

2019

References

External links
Tipperary GAA Fan site
Tipperary on Hoganstand.com
Tipperary GAA site
Premierview
Tipperary GAA Archives

2010 in hurling
2011 in hurling
2012 in hurling
2013 in hurling
2014 in hurling
2015 in hurling
2016 in hurling
2017 in hurling
2018 in hurling
2019 in hurling
1